Buffalo Creek is a tributary of the Monongahela River,  long, in northern West Virginia, in the United States. The stream's entire course and drainage basin are in Marion County.

Buffalo Creek rises near Marion County's western boundary, near the community of Brink, and flows generally eastward through the communities of Logansport, Mannington, Rachel, Farmington, Pine Grove, and Barrackville to Fairmont, where it flows into the Monongahela River from the west.  Among other tributaries, it collects the Pyles Fork from the north at Mannington.  Downstream of Mannington, the creek is paralleled for much of its course by U.S. Route 250.

According to the West Virginia Department of Environmental Protection, approximately 84% of the Buffalo Creek watershed is forested, mostly deciduous.  Approximately 14% is used for pasture and agriculture.

Flow rate
The highest recorded flow during the period was 10,400 cu ft/s (294 m³/s) on February 19, 2000. The lowest recorded flow was 0 cu ft/s (0 m³/s) for an extended period in 1908.

See also
List of rivers of West Virginia
Barrackville Covered Bridge

References 

Rivers of West Virginia
Tributaries of the Monongahela River
Rivers of Marion County, West Virginia
Fairmont, West Virginia